Hearts at Sea is a 1950 Italian adventure film directed by Giorgio Bianchi. Sophia Loren  appears as an uncredited extra.

Plot 
Three students of the Naval Academy face the beginning of their nautical career, between new impossible loves, fears of water, and choices of gratitude.

Cast
 Doris Dowling - Doris 
 Jacques Sernas - Paolo Silvestri 
 Milly Vitale - Fioretta 
 Charles Vanel - Nurus 
 Marcello Mastroianni - Massimo Falchetti 
 Paolo Panelli - Un marinaio 
 Gualtiero Tumiati
 Enzo Biliotti
 Nicola Morabito
 Aldo Fiorelli
 Mimì Aylmer
 Dina Perbellini
 Sophia Loren - Extra (uncredited)

References

External links 
 

1950 films
Italian black-and-white films
1950s Italian-language films
Films directed by Giorgio Bianchi
Films set in Tuscany
Films scored by Enzo Masetti
Italian adventure films
1950 adventure films
1950s Italian films